The Caroline I. Wilby Prize was founded in 1897 in memory of Caroline I. Wilby, by her friends and former students. The prize is given annually to the student who has produced the best original work within any of the departments of Radcliffe College, Cambridge in Massachusetts. The prize is only awarded if a dissertation or thesis is considered worthy enough.

The prize was given for the first time in 1899 to Kate Oelzner Petersen, for her thesis On the Sources of the Nonne Prestes Tale. Other winners include the medievalist Lucy Allen Paton (1865-1951), for her thesis Morgain, la fée, a study in the fairy mythology of the middle ages, the historian Grace Lee Nute (1895-1990) for her thesis American foreign commerce (1825-1850) and also the astronomer Dorrit Hoffleit (1907-2007), for her thesis On the Spectroscopic Determination of Absolute Magnitudes…. Florence Shirley Patterson Jones's dissertation, Surface photometry of external galaxies won the Wilby Prize in 1941.

Recipients

References

Radcliffe College and Institute
Awards established in 1897
Student awards